Chalcorana scutigera is a species of "true frog" in the family Ranidae. However, it is a poorly known species that might actually be synonymous with Polypedates leucomystax. It is endemic to Peninsular Thailand. Common names Haut Sanuk frog and yellow trea frog have been coined for it.

Description
The specimen was yellow when observed alive but turned paler when caught, with the yellow colour almost disappearing. The snout is rounded. The tympanum is very distinct. The fingers and toes are slender and bear well-developed discs; the toes are broadly webbed.

Habitat and conservation
Habitat requirements of Chalcorana scutigera are unknown, but it presumably breeds in water. The holotype was caught from a "cactus". Threats to it are unknown, and it is also unknown whether it occurs in protected areas.

References

scutigera
Amphibians of Thailand
Endemic fauna of Thailand
Amphibians described in 1916
Taxa named by Lars Gabriel Andersson